Railroad Gazette was a trade journal first published in April 1856 that focused on railroad, transportation and engineering topics. Master mechanics read and used the publication to share information about railway matters with one another. An article in the publication documented what was purported to be the first locomotive run in the United States on a railroad, which was stated as performed by the author of the article. It also reported about the Erie Railroad's Rochester Division's electrification and about the opening of the Thebes Bridge. Over time Railroad Gazette editors included Arthur Mellen Wellington, Silas Wright Dunning (1838–1924) and Matthias Nace Forney with Horace Cleveland as an article contributor.

Another publication of the same name Railroad Gazette was established in 1843 in Rogersville, Tennessee. It focused exclusively upon "internal improvement".

Overview
Railroad Gazette was a trade journal published in the United States that focused on railroad news, transportation and engineering. The journal also published editorial content. It was established and first published in April 1856. Master train mechanics were among the journal's readership, who used it to share in technological information about railway matters. The publication served as a forum for readers to discuss railroad management and technology.

Content
In February–June 1872, Railroad Gazette published a series of articles written by a person using the pen name "Hindoo", and reader comments in response to the articles. Hindoo was a British colonial official who was visiting the United States, who stated that the Indian railway system very rarely had problems with head-on and rear-end collisions, which were more frequent in the United States. Hindoo proposed that this was due to the manner in which Indian train stations dispatched trains using telegraphs, in which a system was used whereby each train station acted as a "blocking point." This blocking point system was originally devised by the British railroad industry, and forbade trains from leaving a station until a telegraph was received from the next station stating that the line was clear, upon which a clearance card was issued to the train operator. Hindoo felt that the U.S. system placed too much responsibility upon a single dispatcher, who would "oversee all freight and passenger train movements on a division."

Hindoo's articles provided a comparison of safety matters between Indian and American railway systems, comparisons of management systems and styles and comparisons in train dispatching methods. A main contributor to the ongoing discussion was a reader using the pen name "X", and several other readers also responded. In a response, X stated that the U.S. system was less expensive and more efficient compared to British and Indian methods, and posited whether another system could be used that is both cost effective and safe. Additional reader responses generally concurred with X's opinion, but did not provide solid suggestions about how to remedy such problems. One respondent stated that some of the comparisons were faulty as being based upon U.S. railway lines that did not use telegraphic dispatching. This discourse in Railroad Gazette during this time also covered various aspects of problems and flaws in the American railroad system, and potential reforms to remedy these problems.

An article published on April 18, 1884 in Railroad Gazette, written by railroad engineer Horatio Allen and titled "The First Railroad in America", states that the author (Allen) was the operator of the first locomotive run in the United States on a railroad. Allen stated that on August 9, 1829, he ran a locomotive named Stourbridge Lion in Pennsylvania "three miles and back over rails of wood upon which bar iron 2 ¼ inches wide and 1 ½ inch thick was spiked down".

Railroad Gazette reported about the electrification of the Erie Railroad's Rochester Division. It also reported about the Thebes Bridge at the time the bridge was opened in Illinois.

Personnel
Arthur Mellen Wellington was one of the editors of Railroad Gazette from 1884 to early 1887. Wellington's work The Economic Theory of the Location of Railroads was first published in a series of Railroad Gazette articles in 1876. A book of the same content was published in 1877 by Railroad Gazette. Matthias Nace Forney was editor of the publication in the (circa) 1870s. In 1866, Forney patented a concept for urban elevated railways which "later became the de facto standard for elevated railway service". Articles written by the noted American landscape architect Horace Cleveland that focused upon tree planting efforts in the western United States were published in Railroad Gazette.

Selected works
 
 A list of accessible Railroad Gazette issues may be accessed at Railroad gazette, published by the Hathi Trust Digital Library.

See also

 Railway Age
 List of American rail transport magazines

References

Further reading

External links
 
 Railroad Gazette. Bestfriendofcharleston.org. – contains excerpts from the edition of April 11, 1874 of Railroad Gazette

Rail transport magazines published in the United States
Defunct magazines published in the United States
Engineering magazines
Magazines established in 1856
Magazines with year of disestablishment missing